Cortinarius pavelekii is a species of fungus native to the Pacific Northwest of North America.

References

External links

pavelekii
Fungi of North America